Kamano No. 2 Rural LLG is a local-level government (LLG) of Eastern Highlands Province, Papua New Guinea. The Kamano language is spoken in the LLG.

Wards
01. Sohe
02. Usurufa
03. Karufa/Tafesa
04. Ijavinon - Ta
05. Anumaga
06. Yamaso

References

Local-level governments of Eastern Highlands Province